Gary Holman may refer to:

 Gary Holman (baseball) (born 1944), baseball player
 Gary Holman (politician), Canadian politician